Local elections were held in Imus on May 13, 2013, in conjunction with the 2013 Philippine midterm elections.  Registered voters of the city elected candidates for the following elective local posts: district representative, provincial board members representing the city, mayor, vice mayor, and twelve councilors at-large.

Mayor Emmanuel Maliksi of the Liberal Party narrowly won over ousted Mayor Homer Saquilayan while his running mate, Vice Mayor Mandy Ilano was reelected overwhelmingly. Maliksi's ticket took all but two seats in the Sangguniang Panlungsod.

Overview

The most recent elections conducted in the then-municipality of Imus in 2010 is considered as one of the most controversial, if not the most controversial, elections with questionable results.  In the country's first-ever automated election, where precinct optical count scanning (PCOS) machines were utilized, then comebacking Homer T. Saquilayan defeated the then incumbent Mayor Manny Maliksi, once his vice mayor and the son of then governor Ayong Maliksi, by 8,499 votes.  On May 21, 2010, Maliksi filed an election protest alleging irregularities caused by the PCOS machine count, among others "double-shading" of ballots, ambiguous votes, and over-voting.

After the first recount, Imus Regional Trial Court Judge Cesar Mangrobang released a decision in November 2011 declaring the younger Maliksi as the duly elected mayor of the town, with 41,088 votes as against that of Saquilayan's 40,423, for a difference of 665 votes.  This decision angered the incumbent mayor's supporters and municipal employees and on December 2, 2011, they successfully prevented Maliksi in formally assuming office, thereby causing further tension between the rival camps.  Such tension only averted three days before the turn of the year on December 28, 2011, when Saquilayan ceded the post to his rival with the promise of avenging his latest setback before the courts and the COMELEC.

Barely five months later, in May 2012, the COMELEC overturned the decision of Mangrobang, citing that he gravely abused its discretion when it issued the order since it did not have the necessary grounds and ordered Saquilayan to be reinstated.  This prompted Maliksi to file a motion for reconsideration but it was dismissed by the poll body in September 2012 "for lack of merit."  On October 10, 2012, Maliksi elevated his appeal to the Supreme Court and filed a petition for an issuance of a temporary restraining order (TRO).  Five days later, Chief Justice Maria Lourdes Sereno issued him a TRO.

The TRO was lifted by the Supreme Court on March 12, 2013 and declared Saquilayan as the duly elected mayor. He took his oath six days later, on March 18. Maliksi, however, refused to recognize the ruling and filed for a motion for reconsideration, which the court granted on April 11, 2013, thereby reinstating him as mayor.

Results

Names in boldface denote the winners.

District Representative

The candidates for district representative, mayor, and vice mayor with the highest number of votes win their respective seats.  They are elected separately; therefore, they may be of different parties when elected.

Ayong Maliksi is running for Governor, his party nominates former Board Member, Alex Advincula. Albert Villaseca is also nominate by Nacionalista party.

Board Members

Voters of Imus elect two members to the Sangguniang Panlalawigan of Cavite as part of the third district, which is contiguous with the legislative district.  The two candidates with the highest number of votes for the positions win.

Larry Boy Nato is the only incumbent who sought reelection, which Rodrigo Arguelles did not run in favor of Councilor Arnel Cantimbuhan.

Mayor

Vice Mayor

City Councilors
Upon the adoption of a city charter, seats in the new Sangguniang Panglungsod of Imus (Imus City Council) have increased from eight to twelve and were elected at-large, similar to that of neighboring city of Dasmariñas and 98% of component cities in the Philippines.

Candidates

Of the incumbent councilors elected in 2010, only one did not seek re-election:
Argel Joseph Reyes, and 
Arnel Cantimbuhan, who is running for provincial board member representing Imus.

Aside from re-electionist candidates, names in italics denote appointed councilors and ex officio officials, in the case of SK Federation President Darlon Jay Sayarot.

Administration coalition (Team Maliksi)

Primary opposition coalition (Team Saki-Villena)

Independent candidates not in tickets

Results

|-
|bgcolor=black colspan=5|

External links
Official website of the Commission on Elections
 Official website of National Movement for Free Elections (NAMFREL)
Official website of the Parish Pastoral Council for Responsible Voting (PPCRV)

2013 Philippine local elections
Elections in Cavite
Imus
2013 elections in Calabarzon